Kim Min-chan (born February 26, 1987) is a South Korean curler. He competed in the 2018 Winter Olympics as the alternate on the South Korean men's team skipped by Kim Chang-min.

Personal life
Kim's father is Kim Kyung-doo, the former president of the Korean Curling Federation who was banned in 2018 following claims of abuse made by Team Kim Eun-jung. His sister is Kim Min-jung, Team Kim's former coach.

References

1987 births
Living people
Curlers at the 2018 Winter Olympics
South Korean male curlers
Olympic curlers of South Korea
Universiade medalists in curling
Universiade gold medalists for South Korea
Competitors at the 2007 Winter Universiade
21st-century South Korean people